Uruguayan Football Stadiums are mainly used by clubs in the Uruguayan League and in some cases are maintained by the various departmental governments. The nation's oldest stadium is the Gran Parque Central Stadium, owned Nacional, built in 1900, while the largest capacity stadium is the Centenario Stadium, owned by the Municipality of Montevideo, with 60,235 spectators.

List by División

Primera División Stadiums

Segunda División Stadiums

Tercera División Stadiums

List by capacity 
The following is a list of football stadiums in Uruguay, ordered by capacity.

Gallery

See also
List of South American stadiums by capacity
List of association football stadiums by capacity
Officials championships of football of Uruguay

References

External links

 
Uruguay
Football stadiums
Stadiums